Land of Dreams is a 1988 Swedish essay film by Jan Troell. Its original Swedish title is Sagolandet, which means "The land of tales". Through a series of reportages from contemporary Sweden, Troell uses the film to ponder on the country's transformation since his childhood, into a society he argues has become permeated by rationality at the expense of creativity. Interweaved with the reportages are conversations with the American existential psychologist Rollo May, the politician Ingvar Carlsson soon before he became the prime minister of Sweden, and former prime minister Tage Erlander. Filming took place from 1983 to 1986.

Release
The film premiered in Sweden on 8 February 1988, distributed by the Swedish Film Institute. It was screened in the Forum section of the 38th Berlin International Film Festival. It won the Swedish Film Critics Award for best domestic film of 1988.

References

External links
 

1988 documentary films
1988 films
1980s English-language films
Films directed by Jan Troell
Films set in Sweden
Films shot in Sweden
Swedish documentary films
1980s Swedish-language films
1988 multilingual films
Swedish multilingual films
1980s Swedish films